Leum Uilleim is a mountain in Lochaber, Highland, Scotland which appeared in the film Trainspotting. It is situated about 3 km south-west of the remote Corrour railway station, but is considerably further from any road.

References

Lochaber
Marilyns of Scotland
Mountains and hills of the Central Highlands
Corbetts
Mountains and hills of Highland (council area)